Phnum Kok is a commune in Veun Sai District in northeast Cambodia. It contains five villages and has a population of 889. In the 2007 commune council elections, all five seats went to members of the Cambodian People's Party.

Villages

References

Communes of Ratanakiri province